The Monk: Live at Bimhuis is a live tribute album of Miho Hazama and Metropole Orkest Big Band playing Thelonious Monk which was released in February 2018.

Background
2017 was the 100th anniversary year of Thelonious Monk's birth. Before the year, Miho hazama proposed to Metropole Orkest to hold concerts to play Thelonious Monk when she visited Metropole in September 2016, and recognized need for reasonable planning after the discussion with the producer. Under the condition of neither relationship with Monk's family nor involvement of American players, she proposed a tribute plan which includes orchestration of originally piano solo tracks and providing opportunity of make possible to compare among different arrangers, Bill Holman, Oliver Nelson and Miho. The plan was approved and concerts were held at four cities in Netherlands. Although arrangements by other arrangers were played at the concerts, they are not included in this album.

Regards to tribute jazz album, Metropole Orkest had experience of Better Get Hit In Your Soul: A Tribute To the Music of Charles Mingus which was recorded in 2009, and released in 2012.

Track listing
All compositions by Thelonious Monk except as indicated. All arrangements by Miho Hazama.
"Thelonious" * – 6:42
"Ruby, My Dear" * – 8:36
"Friday the 13th" * – 6:58
"Hackensack" – 6:50
"'Round Midnight" (Bernie Hanighen, Cootie Williams and Thelonious Monk) – 7:53
"Epistrophy" * (Kenny Clarke and Thelonious Monk) – 7:52
"Crepuscule with Nellie" – 5:14

 * Originally piano solo by Thelonious Monk.

Personnel

 Miho Hazama – conductor
Jan Bastiani, Jan Oosting, Louk Boudesteijn – trombone
Martin van den Berg – bass Trombone
Martijn de Laat, Nico Schepers, Ray Bruinsma – trumpet
 – trumpet, flugelhorn
Leo Janssen, Marc Scholten, Max Boeree, Paul van der Feen, Sjoerd Dijkhuizen – saxophone, clarinet
Hans Vroomans – piano
  – guitar
Aram Kersbergen – bass
 – drums

See also
Bill Holman, Brilliant Corners: The Music of Thelonious Monk (JVC, 1997)
Thelonious Monk, Monk's Blues (Columbia, 1968) arranged by Oliver Nelson

References

2018 live albums
Miho Hazama albums
Sunnyside Records live albums
Verve Records live albums
Thelonious Monk tribute albums